Loud is an album by the rock group Half Japanese. It was released on the Armageddon label in 1981.

The album was the band's first release since the line-up was expanded with four new members (two saxophone players, a guitarist, and a drummer); it contains elements of free jazz. The album includes a cover version of The Doors' "The Spy."

It was reissued on compact disc in 2004 on Drag City, together with the Horrible EP, as Loud and Horrible.

Critical reception
The Spin Alternative Record Guide called it "Half Jap's finest hour, and one of the ultimate recorded documents of inchoate teenage angst."

Track listing

References 

1981 albums
Half Japanese albums